Zaynab bint Jaḥsh, was the first cousin and the seventh wife of Muhammad and therefore, considered by Muslims to be a Mother of the Believers.

Early life
Zaynab's father was Jahsh ibn Riyab, an immigrant from the Asad ibn Khuzaymah tribe who had settled in Mecca under the protection of the Umayya clan. Her mother was Umayma bint Abd al-Muttalib, a member of the Hashim clan of the Quraysh tribe and a sister of Muhammad's father. Hence Zaynab and her five siblings were the first cousins of Muhammad.

Zaynab was said to be quick to lose her temper but also quick to calm down. She was a skilled tanner and leather-worker. She continued with this line of work throughout her life, even after she no longer needed the money.

Marriage(s)

First marriage
Zaynab's first marriage was likely before Islam. The name of her first husband is not known to history, but it is mentioned that he had died by the time of Hijrah in the year of 622 CE. At that time Zaynab, who had become a Muslim, was among those who accompanied her brother Abdullah on the Hijrah to Medina.

Marriage to Zayd

Circumstances of the marriage
Around 625, Muhammad proposed Zaynab to marry his adopted son, Zayd ibn Harithah. Zayd had been born into the Kalb tribe but as a child he had been kidnapped by slave-traders. He had been sold to a nephew of Khadija bint Khuwaylid, who in her turn had given him as a wedding present to her husband Muhammad. After some years, Muhammad had manumitted Zayd and had adopted him as his son.

Zaynab, supported by her brother Abdullah, at first refused the proposal on the grounds that, "I am a widow of the Quraysh." She presumably implied that her social status was too high to allow her to marry an ex-slave. It has been asserted that these social differences were precisely the reason why Muhammad wanted to arrange the marriage:

"The Prophet was well aware that it is a person’s standing in the eyes of Allah that is important, rather than his or her status in the eyes of the people... their marriage would demonstrate that it was not who their ancestors were, but rather their standing in the sight of Allah, that mattered."

It has also been suggested that he wanted to establish the legitimacy and right to equal treatment of the adopted. By contrast, Montgomery Watt points out that Zayd was high in Muhammad's esteem.

"She can hardly have thought that he was not good enough. She was an ambitious woman, however, and may already have hoped to marry Muhammad; or she may have wanted to marry someone with whom Muhammad did not want his family to be so closely allied."

When Muhammad announced a new verse of the Qur'an: 

Zaynab acquiesced and married Zayd. Muhammad personally paid the dower of 160 dirhams in cash, a cloak and veil, a coat of armour, 50 mudd of grain and 10 mudd of dates.

Circumstances of the divorce
The marriage lasted less than two years.

The 9th-century historian al-Tabari gives two independent accounts of a visit that Muhammad paid to Zayd's house. The hairskin curtain that served as Zayd’s front door was blown aside, accidentally revealing Zaynab dressed only in her shift. Zaynab arose to dress herself, informing him that Zayd was not at home but he was welcome to visit. However, he did not enter. He exclaimed to himself, "Praise be to Allah, who turns hearts around!" and then departed.

When Zayd came home, Zaynab told him what had happened. Zayd went to Muhammad, saying: "Prophet I have heard about your visit. Perhaps you admire Zaynab, so I will divorce her." Muhammad replied, "No, fear Allah and keep your wife." After this there was conflict between the couple, and Zaynab shut Zayd out of the bedroom.

However, this story has been rejected by most Muslim scholars mainly because of its lack of having any chain of narration and its complete absence from any authentic hadith. Some commentators have found it absurd that Muhammad would suddenly become aware of Zaynab's beauty one day after having known her all her life. If her beauty had been the reason for Muhammad to marry her, he would have married her himself in the first place rather than arranging her marriage to Zayd. 

Furthermore, historiographic assessments suggest that the "lovestruck" narrative itself was a fabrication that developed over a century after the death of Muhammad.

Zayd divorced Zaynab in December 626.

Marriage to Muhammad

Preparation for the marriage
Muhammad expected criticism if he married Zaynab. Pre-Islamic custom disapproved of marriage between a man and his adopted son's former wife. Arab society would have viewed this union as profoundly wrong, because it was considered an adopted son was truly a "son".  Therefore, for a man to marry his adopted son's wife - even if she was divorced - was considered incestuous. As a result, he "hid in his heart" the idea that he might marry her. This internal conflict is mentioned in the Qur'an :

After this verse was announced, Muhammad proceeded to reject the existing Arabian norms. Thereafter the legal status of adoption was not recognised under Islam. Zayd reverted to being known by his original name of "Zayd ibn Harithah" instead of "Zayd ibn Muhammad".

In Pre-Islamic Era the Arabs used to consider an adopted person similarly to a blood relative as far as rights including right to inheritance and sanctities are concerned.

After marriage the sponsored children lost their inheritance rights and were known as the children of biological parents. The sponsored children after attaining puberty could not live with the sponsor family. The sponsored children were funded after puberty. The purpose was to reduce enmity of biological children towards sponsored children and to prevent mingling of a male sponsor with an adult sponsored female. 

Critics of Muhammad have pointed to this surah as an example of a self-serving revelation that reflected Muhammad’s desires rather than the will of God. Some Muslim historians have understood the discrepancy between Muhammad's private thoughts and his expressed words to refer, not to a desire to marry Zaynab, but only to a prophetic foreknowledge that the marriage was going to happen.

Medinese Hypocrites, a term that refers to those who convert to Islam while working against it, spread many rumours against the marriage.

The wedding
Muhammad married Zaynab as soon as her waiting-period from her divorce was complete, on 27 March 627. He went into her house when she did not expect him and without knocking. She asked him: "Is it going to be like this, without any witnesses or trustee (wali) for our union?" Muhammad replied: "Allah is the witness and Gabriel is the trustee."

Muhammad gave Zaynab a dower of 400 dirhams. Later he held a wedding banquet for her and slaughtered a sheep. Anas ibn Malik said there were over seventy guests, and that none of Muhammad's other wives was given such a large banquet. 

As soon as the men had departed, Muhammad announced a new ayat of the Quran.

Life in Medina
Aisha believed that Muhammad's favourite wives, after herself, were Zaynab and Umm Salama. She said: "Zaynab was my equal in beauty and in the Prophet's love for her." Umm Salama said of Zaynab: "The Messenger of Allah liked her and he also used to become vexed with her." On two occasions, when Muhammad divided a gift of food among all his wives, Zaynab was displeased with her portion and sent it back to him.

Several traditions indicate conflict between Zaynab and her co-wives. She used to boast to them: "You were given in marriage by your families, while I was married (to the Prophet) by Allah from over seven Heavens." In one quarrel, Zaynab shouted insults at Aisha while Muhammad was present. Aisha retaliated with "hot words until I made her quiet." Muhammad only commented that Aisha was "really the daughter of Abu Bakr." Another time Zaynab refused to lend her spare camel to Safiyya; Muhammad was so angry that he did not speak to Zaynab for over two months. Aisha related that the wives were divided into two factions, one led by herself and the other by Umm Salama. Zaynab was allied to Umm Salama, together with Umm Habiba, Juwayriyya and Maymunah.

Yet it was Zaynab who defended Aisha when the latter was accused of adultery. Muhammad asked her if she knew anything about it, and Zaynab replied: "O Allah's Messenger! I refrain to claim hearing or seeing what I have not heard or seen. By Allah, I know nothing except goodness about Aisha." Aisha conceded: "I have never seen a woman more advanced in religious piety than Zaynab, more God-conscious, more truthful, more alive to the ties of blood, more generous and having more sense of self-sacrifice in practical life and having more charitable disposition and thus more close to God, the Exalted, than she was."

Zaynab had a reputation for being prayerful. She prayed so much by night that she hung a rope between two pillars in the mosque and held onto it when she became too tired to stand. When Muhammad discovered the rope, he removed it and told her that when she became tired, she should stop praying and sit down.

Later life
After Muhammad’s death, Zaynab never left Medina again. She was a widow for nine years, during which time she narrated eleven ahadith.

She continued to work at tanning and leather-crafts, and she gave away all her profits in charity. Even when Caliph Umar sent her the pension of 12,000 dirhams that he allowed to all of Muhammad's widows, Zaynab gave it all away to various poor families in Medina. At her death, her heirs did not find a single coin in her house.

Death
Zaynab died during the caliphate of Umar in 20 AH, in the summer of 640 or 641 CE, being the first of Muhammad's widows to die after him. She was 53 (lunar) years old.

See also
 Jahsh (name)
 Zaynab (name)

References

590 births
641 deaths
Wives of Muhammad
Women in medieval warfare
Women in war in the Middle East
Muslim female saints
Burials at Jannat al-Baqī
Arab women in war